Dimitris Tofalos Arena (alternate spelling: Dimitrios Tofalos Arena) is an indoor sports arena that is located in Proastio, Patras, Greece. The arena is named after the great Greek wrestling champion of the early 20th century, and gold medalist at the 1906 Intercalated Games, Dimitrios Tofalos. It is also known by its original official name, which is PEAK, which stands for Pampeloponnisiako Ethniko Athlitiko Kentro Patron (Greek: ΠΕΑΚ Παμπελοποννησιακό Εθνικό Αθλητικό Κέντρο), which means Pampeloponnisiako National Sports Center Patras.

The arena has a seating capacity for basketball games of 4,200 people.

History

Dimitris Tofalos Arena opened in 1995. The arena was renovated in the years 2016, 2017, and 2018.

Events hosted
Basketball:
1995 FIBA Under-19 World Cup - preliminaries
1996 Greek Cup Final Four
2003 EuroBasket Women
2005 Greek All-Star Game
2018 Greek All-Star Game
2021 Greek Basketball Super Cup
Volleyball:
1995 Men's European Volleyball Championship - preliminaries
Volleyball at the 1996 Summer Olympics qualification tournament
World League - numerous games
Rhythmic Gymnastics
1997 Rhythmic Gymnastics European Championships
Wrestling
2001 World Wrestling Championships

Clubs hosted
The following clubs have used Dimitris Tofalos Arena as their home arena at one time or another:

Olympias Patras, basketball
Promitheas Patras, basketball
E.A. Patras, volleyball
Ormi Patras, handball

References

External links

Information about the arena @ Stadia.gr
Promitheas Patras Dimitris Tofalos Arena  
Image 1 of the interior of Dimitris Tofalos Arena
Image 2 of the interior of Dimitris Tofalos Arena
Image 3 of the interior of Dimitris Tofalos Arena
Video of Dimitris Tofalos Arena Renovation

Basketball venues in Greece
Handball venues in Greece
Indoor arenas in Greece
Promitheas Patras B.C.
Sports venues in Patras
Volleyball venues in Greece